Paronto is a surname. Notable people with the surname include:

 Chad Paronto (born 1975), American baseball player
 James Paronto (born 1943), American football player, coach, and official
 "Tanto" Kris Paronto (born 1971), American soldier and author